Omphalotropis costulata is a species of minute salt marsh snail with an operculum, a terrestrial gastropod mollusk, or micromollusk, in the family Assimineidae.

Distribution 
The distribution of Omphalotropis costulata includes Fiji.

The type locality is Vanua Balavu.

See also 
Omphalotropis costulata Emberton & Pearce, 1999 is a junior homonym for yet (2012) unnamed species Omphalotropis sp. nov. 2.

References

Omphalotropis
Gastropods described in 1870